Mario Crete (1914 – 28 May 2000) was a Canadian wrestler. He competed in the men's freestyle featherweight at the 1948 Summer Olympics.

References

1914 births
2000 deaths
Canadian male sport wrestlers
Olympic wrestlers of Canada
Wrestlers at the 1948 Summer Olympics
Place of birth missing